Zheng Dongsheng (born 23 January 1992, in Hubei) is a Chinese track and field athlete who specialises in sprinting.

See also 
China at the 2012 Summer Olympics - Athletics
Athletics at the 2012 Summer Olympics – Men's 4 × 100 metres relay

References 

Living people
1992 births
Chinese male sprinters
Runners from Hubei
Athletes (track and field) at the 2012 Summer Olympics
Olympic athletes of China
Athletes (track and field) at the 2010 Asian Games
Universiade medalists in athletics (track and field)
Universiade silver medalists for China
Asian Games competitors for China
Sportspeople from Wuhan
Medalists at the 2011 Summer Universiade